Necessary Condition Analysis (NCA) is a quantitative data analytical technique for identifying necessary (but not sufficient) conditions in data sets. NCA primarily acts as a complement to other analytical techniques such as regression-based analysis, structural equation modelling, or Qualitative Comparative Analysis.

NCA allows researchers to analyse how predictor variables constrain the outcome variable by revealing which predictor variables are considered to be necessary, and to what degree they constrain the outcome variable. This is done by evaluating the effect size d of each necessary condition, performing a bootstrapping procedure and examining the statistical significance of the necessary condition, and by having theoretical justification for this type of a relationship

References 
Dul, J. (2016). Necessary condition analysis (NCA) logic and methodology of “necessary but not sufficient” causality. Organizational Research Methods, 19(1), 10-52.

Dul, J. (2016). Identifying single necessary conditions with NCA and fsQCA. Journal of Business Research, 69(4), 1516-1523.

Vis, B., & Dul, J. (2018). Analyzing relationships of necessity not just in kind but also in degree: Complementing fsQCA with NCA. Sociological methods & research, 47(4), 872-899.

Dul, J. (2022). Necessary Condition Analysis (NCA) with R (Version 3.2. 0): A Quick Start Guide.

Dul, J., Van der Laan, E., & Kuik, R. (2020). A statistical significance test for necessary condition analysis. Organizational Research Methods, 23(2), 385-395.

Richter, N. F., Schubring, S., Hauff, S., Ringle, C. M., & Sarstedt, M. (2020). When predictors of outcomes are necessary: Guidelines for the combined use of PLS-SEM and NCA. Industrial management & data systems.

Sukhov, A., Olsson, L. E., & Friman, M. (2022). Necessary and sufficient conditions for attractive public Transport: Combined use of PLS-SEM and NCA. Transportation Research Part A: Policy and Practice, 158, 239-250.

Data analysis